Candido Tirona y Tria (August 29, 1863 – November 10, 1896) was a Filipino revolutionary leader who participated in the Battle of Binakayan-Dalahican during the Philippine Revolution. He was a secretary of war in Magdalo chapter of the Katipunan and a close friend of Emilio Aguinaldo.

Tirona was born to Don Estanislao Tirona and Juana Mata. His father was a capitan municipal of Cavite Viejo. His brother Daniel Tirona also became a general in the revolution.

References

1863 births
1896 deaths